The NATO Rapid Deployable Corps - Spain (NRDC-SP) (also Rapid Deployable Spanish Corps) is a corps headquarters of the Spanish Army. It was established in 2000 as a High Readiness Force (HRF) of NATO. Its facilities are located at the "Jaime I" Military Base in Bétera, province of Valencia.

History
The NATO Rapid Deployable Headquarters - Spain was established in 2000.

Structure
The NATO Rapid Deployable Headquarters can be quickly deployed for disaster management, humanitarian assistance, peace support, counterterrorism and high-intensity warfighting.

References

Military units and formations established in 2000
Army units and formations of Spain
Corps
NATO Rapid Deployable Corps
Spain and NATO